Presidente Bernardes is a municipality in the state of Minas Gerais in Brazil. The population is 5,341 (2020 est.) in an area of 237 km2. The elevation is 591 m. Presidente Bernardes is named after President Artur da Silva Bernardes.

See also
 List of municipalities in Minas Gerais

References

Municipalities in Minas Gerais